Edgard Poelmans (13 July 1883 – 14 December 1932) was a Belgian footballer. He played in 16 matches for the Belgium national football team from 1904 to 1911.

References

External links
 

1883 births
1932 deaths
Belgian footballers
Belgium international footballers
Association football defenders
Sportspeople from Mechelen
Footballers from Antwerp Province